Veliki Prolog  is a village in Croatia.

Populated places in Split-Dalmatia County